The 1932 International Cross Country Championships was held in Woluwe-Saint-Pierre, Brussels, Belgium, at the Hippodrome de Stockel on March 20, 1932. In addition, an unofficial women's championship was held a day earlier in Croydon, England on March 19, 1932. A report on the men's event was given in the Glasgow Herald.

Complete results for men, and for women (unofficial), medallists, 
 and the results of British athletes were published.

Medallists

Individual Race Results

Men's (9 mi / 14.5 km)

Women's (1.9 mi / 3.0 km)

Team Results

Men's

Women's

Participation

Men's
An unofficial count yields the participation of 52 male athletes from 6 countries.

 (9)
 (9)
 (9)
 (8)
 (9)
 (8)

Women's
An unofficial count yields the participation of 12 female athletes from 2 countries.

 (6)
 (6)

See also
 1932 in athletics (track and field)

References

International Cross Country Championships
International Cross Country Championships
Cross
International Cross Country Championships
Sports competitions in Brussels
Cross country running in Belgium
Cross country running in the United Kingdom
International Cross Country Championships
1930s in Brussels
20th century in Surrey